In Enemy Hands may refer to:

 In Enemy Hands (novel), novel by David Weber
 In Enemy Hands (film), 2004 American film